OPSS may refer to:

Office for Product Safety & Standards, part of the Department for Business, Energy and Industrial Strategy of the Government of the United Kingdom
Orchid Park Secondary School, a secondary school in Yishun, Singapore
OPSS, the ICAO airport code for Saidu Sharif Airport, Pakistan